Kelvin Denis Sánchez Vasquez (born 3 January 1999), is a  Peruvian professional footballer who most recently played as a centre-back for Deportivo Llacuabamba. He has represented the Peru under-17 national team internationally.

References

1999 births
Living people
Peruvian footballers
Peru youth international footballers
Association football central defenders
Academia Deportiva Cantolao players